This is a list of participants, associates and helpers of the Saefkow-Jacob-Bästlein Organization, which was one of the largest resistance organisation during World War II in Germany.  It was formed in Berlin and had contacts to many other regions. It is therefore also referred to in the literature as the operational leadership of the Communist Party of Germany (KPD). However, it was not only communists among the groups of the Saefkov Jacob baker's organisation. The 506 known persons included about 200 before 1933 to the KPD, 22 to the Social Democratic Party of Germany (SPD) or to the Socialist Workers' Party of Germany (SAP) and around 200 were non-party; one in four was a woman. 160 men and women were unionized before 1933, more than 60 of them in the German Metal Workers' Union (DMV). The local or region is indicated for the people who worked outside Berlin and Brandenburg.

A

B

C

D

E

F

G

H

I

J

K

L

M

N

O

P

Q

R

S

T

References

Saefkow-Jacob-Bästlein Organization